Rabdion forsteni is a species of snake in the family Colubridae.

Etymology
The specific name, forsteni, is in honor of Dutch naturalist Eltio Alegondas Forsten.

Geographic range
R. forsteni is endemic to the island of Sulawesi (formerly called Celebes) in  Indonesia.

References

Further reading
Boulenger GA (1894). Catalogue of the Snakes in the British Museum (Natural History). Volume II., Containing the Conclusion of the Colubridæ Aglyphæ. London: Trustees of the British Museum (Natural History). (Taylor and Francis, printers). xi + 382 pp. + Plates I-XX. (Rhabdophidium forsteni, replacement name, p. 328).
Duméril A-M-C, Bibron G, Duméril A[-H-A] (1854). Erpétologie générale ou histoire naturelle complète des reptiles. Tome septième. Première partie. Comprenant l'histoire des serpents non venimeux. [=General Herpetology or Complete Natural History of the Reptiles. Volume 7. Part 1. Containing the Natural History of the Nonvenomous Snakes]. Paris: Roret. xvi + 780 pp. (Rabdion forsteni, new species, pp. 116–119). (in French).

Reptiles described in 1854
Taxa named by André Marie Constant Duméril
Taxa named by Gabriel Bibron
Taxa named by Auguste Duméril
Colubrids
Reptiles of Indonesia